Parapentacentrus  is a genus of crickets, in the subfamily Itarinae (it has also been placed in the Pentacentrinae, tribe Homalogryllini).  Species can be found in Indo-China, south-east China and Taiwan.

Species 
Parapentacentrus includes two species:
Parapentacentrus formosanus Shiraki, 1930 - type species
Parapentacentrus fuscus Gorochov, 1988

See also

References

External links
 Images of P. fuscus Gorochov, 1988 on OSF

Ensifera genera
Crickets
Orthoptera of Asia
Orthoptera of Indo-China